The FTBOA Florida Sire Stakes Affirmed division is a thoroughbred horse race run annually as the third leg of the (FTBOA) Florida Sire stakes series. Inaugurated in 1983 at Calder Race Course as part of the Florida Stallion stakes series the race was named after the Florida-bred Triple Crown winner Affirmed, who was well known for his rivalry with the west coast-bred Alydar. The race was originally run at 6 furlongs but in its second year was increased to 7 furlongs in order to create a gradually increasing set of lengths throughout the series to allow the young horses to step up to each new length as they moved through their training. The Affirmed Stakes has run in two divisions on four separate occasions (1985–1987 and 2001). The race was discontinued at Calder Race Course in 2012 and taken over by Gulfstream Park in 2013.

Records
Speed record: (at current distance of 7 furlongs)
 Soutache 2017 (1:22.46)

Most wins by a jockey:
 3 – Gene St. Leon (1984, Div.2 – 1985, 1988)
 3 – José A. Vélez Jr. (1983, 1990, 1991)

Most wins by a trainer:
 4 – Frank Gomez (Div.2 – 1987, 1990, 1991, 2005)

Most wins by an owner:
 3 – Jacks or Better Farm, Inc. (2009, 2011, 2014)

Winners
Gulfstream Park 2017–2018 Media Guide and race history:

References

Horse races in Florida
Flat horse races for two-year-olds
Recurring sporting events established in 1982
Calder Race Course
1982 establishments in Florida